The 2018–19 St. John's Red Storm women's basketball team represented St. John's University during the 2018–19 NCAA Division I women's basketball season. The Red Storm, led by seventh-year head coach Joe Tartamella, played their games at Carnesecca Arena with 1 game at Madison Square Garden and were members of the Big East Conference. They finished the season 15–16, 7–11 in Big East play to finish in a tie for eighth place. They advanced to the quarterfinals of the Big East women's basketball tournament to Creighton where they lost to Marquette.

Roster

Schedule

|-
!colspan=9 style=| Non-conference regular season

|-
!colspan=9 style=| Big East regular season

|-
!colspan=9 style=| Big East Women's Tournament

See also
 2018–19 St. John's Red Storm men's basketball team

References

Saint John's
St. John's Red Storm women's basketball seasons
Saint John's
Saint John's